The Mike Alex Cabin is a historic log cabin in Eklutna, Alaska.  Located across from Eklutna's Russian Orthodox churches in the center of the community, it was built in 1925 for Mike Alex, the last traditional clan chieftain of the Athabaskan people in Eklutna.  It consists of three sides of an originally square log structure, to which a log addition was made in the 1930s, removing one of the original four walls.  The building was around that time also topped by a new gable roof.  It is, along with the older church, a reminder of the people's history.

The cabin was listed on the National Register of Historic Places.

See also
National Register of Historic Places listings in Anchorage, Alaska

References

Houses on the National Register of Historic Places in Alaska
Houses in Anchorage, Alaska
Log cabins in the United States
Buildings and structures on the National Register of Historic Places in Anchorage, Alaska
Log buildings and structures on the National Register of Historic Places in Alaska